Carlos Bianchi (19 December 1910 – 20 October 1935) was an Argentine sprinter. He competed in the men's 100 metres at the 1932 Summer Olympics.

References

1910 births
1935 deaths
Athletes (track and field) at the 1932 Summer Olympics
Argentine male sprinters
Olympic athletes of Argentina
Place of birth missing
20th-century Argentine people